Below is a list of actors and actresses that are part of the cast of the American police procedural drama television series NCIS.

Cast members 

This table lists characters who have appeared in two or more episodes (excluding flashbacks) and the cast members who have portrayed them.

Color key:

Crossovers

JAG 
 Mark Harmon, Michael Weatherly, David McCallum, and Pauley Perrette all appeared in two episodes of season eight of JAG that served as a back door pilot. 
 Patrick Labyorteaux appeared as his JAG character in three episodes of NCIS (one each in seasons 1, 14, and 15)
 John M. Jackson appeared as his JAG character in one episode of season ten of NCIS. 
 Adam Baldwin appeared as his JAG character in one episode of season one of NCIS.
 Alicia Coppola appeared as her JAG character in three episodes of NCIS (one in season one and two in season two).

NCIS: Los Angeles 
 Chris O'Donnell, Peter Cambor, Daniela Ruah, Barrett Foa, LL Cool J, and Brian Avers all appeared as their NCIS: Los Angeles characters in two episodes of NCIS''' season six that served as a back door pilot.
 Rocky Carroll appeared in ten episodes of NCIS: Los Angeles as his NCIS character (seven in season one, and one each in seasons two, three, and six).
 Pauley Perrette appeared in two first-season episodes of LA. David Dayan Fisher appeared in one first-season episode of LA Michael Weatherly appeared in one seventh-season episode of LA Kelly Hu appeared in one episode of the seventh season of NCIS as her LA character.

 NCIS: New Orleans 
 Scott Bakula, Zoe McLellan, Lucas Black, and C. C. H. Pounder all appeared as their NCIS: New Orleans characters in two episodes of NCIS' season 11 that served as a back door pilot.
 Actors who appeared on the first season of NCIS: New Orleans as their NCIS characters include Diane Neal (three), Rocky Carroll  (three), Pauley Perrette (one), Meredith Eaton (one), Joe Spano (one), David McCallum (one), Michael Weatherly (one), and Mark Harmon (one).
 Leslie Hope appeared in one second-season episode of NCIS: New Orleans as her NCIS'' character

Guest stars

Notes

References

External links 
 Full episode cast of NCIS at the Internet Movie Database

Lists of actors by drama television series
Cast members